Saint Kitts and Nevis competed at the 2011 Pan American Games in Guadalajara, Mexico from October 14 to 30, 2011, sending six athletes, all of whom competed in athletics.

At the games Kim Collins won the Saint Kitts and Nevis' first ever medal at a Pan American Games.

Medalists

Athletics

Saint Kitts and Nevis qualified to send six athletes.

Men
Track and road events

Women
Track and road events

References

Nations at the 2011 Pan American Games
P
2011